Alistipes onderdonkii is a Gram-negative, rod-shaped and anaerobic bacterium from the genus of Alistipes which has been isolated from a human abdominal abscess in the United States.

References

Bacteria described in 2006
Bacteroidia